Mar Andrews Thazhath (born 13 December 1951) is an Indian Catholic prelate and Archeparch of Thissur in the Syro-Malabar Catholic Church.

Life
He is the third and the present metropolitan archbishop of Syro-Malabar Catholic Archeparchy of Thrissur from 2007. He was nominated as the archbishop succeeding Mar Jacob Thoomkuzhy on 22 January 2007 and was installed to the office on 18 March 2007 by Cardinal Mar Varkey Vithayathil.
He is the founder of Legion of Apostolic Families (LOAF), a lay pious association of consecrated families founded in 2009.

On 30 July 2022 in addition to his current duties archbishop Thazhath was appointed as an Apostolic Administrator sede plena of the Major Archeparchy of Ernakulam–Angamaly

Selected publications

References

External links

 Profile at the Catholic Hierarchy

1950 births
Living people
Syro-Malabar Catholics
Archbishops of Thrissur
21st-century Eastern Catholic archbishops
Syro-Malabar archbishops
20th-century Eastern Catholic archbishops
Pontifical Oriental Institute alumni
People from Thrissur district